The 1979 British Speedway Championship was the 19th edition of the British Speedway Championship. The Final took place on 20 June at Brandon Stadium in Coventry, England. The Championship was won by Peter Collins, who scored a 15-point maximum. Former two-time champion Michael Lee finished as the runner-up, with Dave Jessup in third.

Final 
20 June 1979
 Coventry

See also 
 British Speedway Championship

References 

British Speedway Championship
Great Britain